Barlaston is a civil parish in the Borough of Stafford, Staffordshire, England. It contains nine listed buildings that are recorded in the National Heritage List for England. Of these, one is listed at Grade I, the highest of the three grades, and the others are at Grade II, the lowest grade.  The parish contains the village of Barlaston and the surrounding countryside.  The listed buildings include a country house, a smaller house, cottages, a church, a milepost on the Trent and Mersey Canal, a cemetery chapel, and a war memorial.


Key

Buildings

References

Citations

Sources

Lists of listed buildings in Staffordshire